The Last Bohemian is a 1931 Czech biographical film about Jaroslav Hašek directed by Svatopluk Innemann.

Cast
Saša Rašilov as Jaroslav Hašek
Radola Renský as Ríša Hašek
František Havel as Ríša's grandfather
František Sauer as Secret policeman Firnádl
Jan Richter as Dog salesman Alois Kvíčala
Theodor Pištěk as Landowner Ludvík Pazdera
Zdenka Hatláková as Pazdera's wife
Vladimír Beztahovský as Otakar Pazdera
Truda Grosslichtová as Otakar's governess
Anna Švarcová as Pazdera's mother in law

Reception
Premiere was held in Fenix and Metro cinemas in Prague. The film received mixed reviews.

References

External links 
 

Czech biographical films
1930s biographical films
Biographical films about writers
Czechoslovak black-and-white films
Jaroslav Hašek
1930s Czech films